Timeline of K-pop at Billboard is a history of K-pop as recorded by Billboard, Billboard charts and Billboard K-Town, an online magazine column, presented by Billboard on its Billboard.com site, that reports on K-pop music; artists, concerts, chart information and news events. It is followed by later history at Timeline of K-pop at Billboard in the 2020s.

Legend

1998

1999

2000

2001

2002

2003

2004

2005

2006

2007

2008

2009

2010

2011

2012

2013

2014

2015

2016

2017

2018

2019

2020s

See also
 List of K-pop on the Billboard charts
 List of K-pop albums on the Billboard charts
 List of K-pop songs on the Billboard charts
 List of K-pop on the Billboard year-end charts
 Korea K-Pop Hot 100
 List of K-Pop concerts held outside Asia
 List of K-pop artists
 List of South Korean idol groups

References

External links
Billboard 1920 to 2016, American Radio Archives

Timelines of music
K-pop
Billboard (magazine)
K-pop timeline